Hydroacylation is a type of organic reaction in which an alkene is inserted into the a formyl C-H bond. The product is a ketone. The reaction requires a metal catalyst. It is almost invariably practiced as an intramolecular reaction using homogeneous catalysts, often based on rhodium phosphines. 
RCHO  +  CH2=CHR'   →   RC(O)CH2CH2R'
With an alkyne in place of alkenes, the reaction produce an α,β-unsaturated ketone.

Examples
The reaction was discovered as part of a synthetic route to certain prostanoids. The reaction required tin tetrachloride and a stoichiometric amount of Wilkinson's catalyst. An equal amount of a cyclopropane was formed as the result of decarbonylation.

The first catalytic application involved cyclization of 4-pentenal to cyclopentanone using with Wilkinson's catalyst. In this reaction the solvent was saturated with ethylene. 
CH2=CHCH2CH2CHO   →   (CH2)4CO

Reaction mechanism
Labeling studies establish the following regiochemistry:
RCDO  +  CH2=CHR'   →   RC(O)CH2CHDR'

In terms of the reaction mechanism, hydroacylation begins with oxidative addition of the aldehydic carbon-hydrogen bond. The resulting acyl hydride complex next binds the alkene. The sequence of oxidative addition and alkene coordination is often unclear. Via migratory insertion, the alkene inserts into either the metal-acyl or the metal-hydride bonds. In the final step, the resulting alkyl-acyl or beta-ketoalkyl-hydride complex undergoes reductive elimination. A competing side-reaction is decarbonylation of the aldehyde. This process also proceeds via the intermediacy of the acyl metal hydride:
R"C(O)-MLn-H   →   R"-M(CO)Ln-H
This step can be followed by reductive elimination of the alkane:
R"-M(CO)Ln-H   →   R"-H  +  M(CO)Ln

Asymmetric hydroacylation
Hydroacylation as an asymmetric reaction was demonstrated in the form of a kinetic resolution. A true asymmetric synthesis was also described. Both conversions employed rhodium catalysts and a chiral diphosphine ligand. In one application the ligand is Me-DuPhos:

References

Organic reactions